Malati Mangale is a musical drama written by Madhav Prasad Ghimire in 2039 BS (AD 1982–83). One of author's most popular works, and considered one of the best ballets by Nepali poets, it is based on true events from a village in Gorkha.

Adaptation 
It was recorded for the first time as a musical recording in 2044 BS (AD 1987–88). Ghimire brought together music composer Ambar Gurung and singer Narayan Gopal, who were not on speaking terms at the time, to collaborate on the cassette recording of the play. Narayan Gopal could not be convinced to work together with singer Tara Devi; the two recorded their duet with a partition wall between them in the recording studio.

See also 

 Gauri
 Ghumne Mechmathi Andho Manche
 Muna Madan

References

Works by Madhav Prasad Ghimire
Nepalese books
Nepalese plays
Nepali-language books